The Jean and Ric Edelman Fossil Park, located in Mantua Township, New Jersey, consists of a 66-million-year-old  bone bed set into a  former marl quarry.  It is currently the only facility east of the Mississippi River that has an active open quarry for public Community Dig Days.  Formed at the end of the Cretaceous Period during the Cretaceous-Paleogene extinction event, this rich fossil deposit is abundant in marine life which is indicative of the shallow sea that once covered the area that would become Southern New Jersey.  The fossil park is undergoing renovations to become the site of the Jean and Ric Edelman Fossil Park Museum and will be available for school, scout, camp, and public programs once construction is complete. It is currently closed to the public and will reopen after the completion of the museum in 2023.  The Jean and Ric Edelman Fossil Park is owned and operated by Rowan University in Glassboro, New Jersey thanks in part to a generous donation from Jean and Ric Edelman.

Geology 
The bedrock of Gloucester County, where Edelman Fossil Park is located, is composed of alternating layers of sand, silt, and clay due to fluctuating sea levels since the Cretaceous.  These sedimentary sequences are known as facies.  Sedimentary rocks of this area have been dated from between the Lower Cretaceous to the Miocene (145 to 5.3 mya).  The entire area of Southern New Jersey is known as the coastal plain.  It was submerged under a shallow sea until the late Pliocene when the ocean receded as the Greenland ice sheet formed 3 million years ago.  The Coastal Plain begins on a southeast diagonal between Carteret and Trenton with sediments overlapping the rockier Piedmont Formation to the northwest.     

The specific layer in which the fossils are located is known as marl - a dark to light green, manganese-rich, clay that forms when algae, aquatic plants, and aquatic animals decay over a long period in hard-water streams rich in calcium carbonate.  This layer is typically located in swamps, resulting in a covering of a dark organic-rich layer of peat.  Because of marl's formation as the result of decaying plants and algae in soft sediment, it is a great harborer of fossils including numerous invertebrates as well as larger land-dwelling animals whose bodies were swept downstream and laid here to rest.    

Within marl sediments is the mineral vivianite (Fe2+3(PO4)2 · 8H2O) that forms as a result of reduction-oxidation reactions.  This deep blue to bluish-green crystal begins to oxidize in the presence of oxygen, converting Fe2+ to Fe3+ until the blue color becomes almost black and opaque.  Because of this inevitable darkening, there is no such thing as stable vivianite.  Embedded into these layers are also schist dropstones, indicative of the ancient glaciations that occurred in this area during glacial periods.

Site history 

 66 mya:  Chicxulub asteroid crashes into earth off the coast of what is now the Yucatán Peninsula in Mexico, completely killing all dinosaurs (except those that evolved into modern birds), and three-quarters of all life on earth
 1858:  Just a few miles away from the Fossil Park in Haddonfield, NJ, the first complete dinosaur skeleton (a Hadrosaurus) to ever be mounted and exhibited is discovered
 1866:  Edward D. Cope discovers the tyrannosauroid, Dryptosaurus, one mile away from the Fossil Park site in Ceres Park
 1920s:  Operational quarry - The Inversand Company begins dredging the quarry for manganese greensand, sold as an organic fertilizer and water treatment product
 1930s:  Inversand workers uncover fossils in the quarry, and researchers are invited in to investigate alongside quarry workers
 2008:  Mantua Twp names forested land behind Lowe's on Woodbury-Glassboro Rd. part of a redevelopment zone
 2012:  Citizen Science - Dr. Kenneth Lacovara (Drexel University) partners with Michelle Bruner (Mantua Township) to start "Community Dig Days", bringing almost 2,000 visitors per event to dig at the Fossil Park
 2014:  While at Drexel University, Dr. Kenneth Lacovara discovers the titanosaurian sauropod, Dreadnoughtus
 2014:  Dr. Kenneth Lacovara meets with Rowan University president, Dr. Ali A. Houshmand about purchasing the Inversand quarry - he agrees with the premise that Dr. Lacovara would serve as the Fossil Park's Executive Director and Founding Dean of the newly created School of Earth & Environment at Rowan University
 2015:  Inversand ceases operations at the quarry due to the high cost of pumping water out of the quarry
 2015:  Inversand site purchased by Rowan University from the Inversand Company for $1.95 million
 2015:  Rowan University forms School of Earth & Environment, hiring Founding Dean Dr. Kenneth Lacovara
 2016:  Jean and Ric Edelman pledge $25 million toward the preservation and expansion of the Fossil Park, with plans to build a museum and science education facility
 2017:  Jean and Ric Edelman deemed conditional redevelopers of the land parcel owned by Mantua Twp
 2019:  Edelman Financial Services purchase a 40-acre wooded plot adjacent to fossil park from Mantua Township for $655,000
 2021:  Groundbreaking of the $73 million Edelman Fossil Park Museum of Rowan University

Species of interest 

The following are some of the fossils that have been found on site at the Edelman Fossil Park, most of which are extinct species.  An asterisk (*) indicates an extant, or living, species.

Sea turtles and aquatic turtles 

 Taphyrosphys sulcatus
 Catapleura repanda
 Euclastes wielandi
 Bothremys sp.

Cartilaginous fish 

 Odontaspis cuspidata (Sand Tiger Shark)
 Palaeocarcharodon orientalis (Pygmy White Shark)
 Squalicorax pristodontus (Crow Shark)
 Otodus obliquus (early Mackerel Shark)
 Cretolamna appendiculata (early Mackerel Shark)
 Squatina squatina (Angelshark)*
 Notidanodon (early Cow Shark)
 Edaphodon (Ratfish)*
 Ischyodus thurmanni (Chimaera)
 sp. (Stingray)
 Myliobatis leidyi (Eagle Ray)*
 Rhombodus levis (ray)

Bony fish 

 Acipenser albertensis (Sturgeon)
 Enchodus ferox (Saber Toothed Herring)

Crocodiles 

 Thoracosaurus neocesariensis (Crocodylomorph)
 Borealosuchus threeensis (Boreal Crocodile)
 Hyposaurus rogersii (Hyposaurus Crocodylomorph)
 Bottosaurus (Alligatoroid)

Mosasaurs 

 Mosasaurus sp.

Invertebrates 

 Sphenodiscus (Ammonite)
 Pachydiscus (Ammonite)
 Peridonella dichotoma (sponge)
 Cliona cretacea (sponge)
 Flabellum mortoni (coral)
 Oleneothyris harlani (brachiopod)
 Caryatis veta (brachiopod)
 Liopistha protexta (brachiopod)
 Gryphaeostrea vomer
 Nuculana stephensoni (clam)
 Cuculleae vulgaris (False Ark Shell)*
 Agerostrea nasuta (oyster)
 Pycnodonte dissimilaris (oyster)*
Eutrephoceras dekayi (nautilus)
 Baculites (Walking Stick Rock)
 Gyrodes abyssinus (Gyrodes - snail)
 Pyropsis trochiformis (snail)
 Turbinopsis curta (snail)
 Turritella vertebroides (Turritella - sea snail)

Future plans

Gateway to the Cretaceous 
Key stakeholders at the Jean and Ric Edelman Fossil Park at Rowan University broke ground on a $73 million new endeavor on October 9, 2021 – The Jean and Ric Edelman Fossil Park Museum.  Construction of the museum is currently underway, and is scheduled to open in 2023. Visitors to the museum will be transported to the moments surrounding earth's fifth mass extinction: the moments that led to a mass die-off when non-avian dinosaurs and 75% of all other species went extinct.

Guests will be immersed into the world of the Late Cretaceous as it looked in coastal New Jersey alongside both land-dwelling and aquatic creatures fighting for survival. The 44,000 square foot museum will feature interactives and hands-on learning stations, exploration zones, and a paleo-themed playground that are perfect for families. Elsewhere, the Hall of Extinction & Hope will help visitors understand what led to the dinosaurs' demise as well as what we can learn and do about our current climate and biodiversity crises. To provide guests with an even more hands-on learning experience, a Fossil Research Workshop, virtual reality chamber, and of course the fossil dig experience will be available. The Café will feature sustainable food options, and the museum's gift shop will offer items from local artisans.

Sustainability 
The Edelman Fossil Park Museum will be New Jersey's largest public net-zero facility, with 100% of its energy coming from a combination of green energy available in New Jersey's power grid and renewable energy produced on-site. The museum will feature geothermal water-source heat pump heating and cooling systems, a photovoltaic solar field, and the repurposing of on-site materials for interior construction and design. No fossil fuels will be combusted for museum operations and no greenhouse gasses will be released into the atmosphere. The surrounding grounds will utilize native plantings, and plant and animal habitats and other key landscape features will be restored as part of the design footprint.

References 

Fossil parks in the United States
Mantua Township, New Jersey
Parks in Gloucester County, New Jersey
Rowan University
Geology of New Jersey